This is a list of equipment of the Romanian Armed Forces currently in service and storage.

Land Forces

Firearms

Vehicles

Army watercraft

Artillery

Anti-tank

Anti-aircraft

Mines

Army aircraft

Air Forces

Air defence

Airspace survaillance

Support vehicles

Naval Forces

Sea fleet

River fleet

Coastal defense

Auxiliary vessels

Naval aviation

Proposed purchases (future)
These are requests, prototypes and weapons under development/testing which could enter service with the Romanian military.

Stored equipment

Former equipment

Armored fighting vehicles of World War II

World War II Romanian equipment

World War I Romanian equipment

See also
 Arms industry in Romania
 Saur I

References

External links
 Romanian Land Forces
 Romanian Air Force
 Romanian Naval Forces
 Ministry of National Defense

Romanian Land Forces
Military equipment of Romania
Romanian Land Forces
Romanian Army